The Netherlands Football League Championship 1915–1916 was contested by 26 teams participating in three divisions. The national champion would be determined by a play-off featuring the winners of the eastern, southern and western football division of the Netherlands. Willem II won this year's championship by beating Go Ahead and Sparta Rotterdam.

New entrants
Eerste Klasse South: (returning after one season of suspension due to World War I).
MSV Maastricht
NAC
RVV Roermond

Divisions

Eerste Klasse East

Eerste Klasse South
The Eerste Klasse South returned after being suspended for one season due to World War I.

Eerste Klasse West

Championship play-offs

References
RSSSF Netherlands Football League Championships 1898-1954
RSSSF Eerste Klasse Oost
RSSSF Eerste Klasse Zuid
RSSSF Eerste Klasse West

Netherlands Football League Championship seasons
1915–16 in Dutch football
Netherlands